Akiva D. Schaffer (born December 1, 1977) is an American comedian, actor, writer, and film director. He is a member of the comedy group The Lonely Island along with childhood friends Andy Samberg and Jorma Taccone. Schaffer began his career with The Lonely Island making videos for Channel 101. In 2005, Saturday Night Live hired the trio, with Schaffer joining as a writer. In their time at SNL, The Lonely Island pioneered the digital short format, creating some of the most popular sketches of all time, including "Lazy Sunday", "I Just Had Sex", "I'm on a Boat", and "Dick in a Box". After SNL, Schaffer went on to direct movies including Hot Rod, The Watch, Popstar: Never Stop Never Stopping, and Chip 'n Dale: Rescue Rangers. The Lonely Island has made albums such as Incredibad, Turtleneck & Chain, and The Wack Album. Schaffer also produced a number of TV shows and movies, some of which include MacGruber, PEN15, I Think You Should Leave with Tim Robinson, and Palm Springs.

Early life
Schaffer was born in Berkeley, California to Jewish parents from New York.

In 2000, he graduated from the University of California, Santa Cruz with a degree in film.

Career

After college, he and his childhood friends, Andy Samberg and Jorma Taccone, moved to Los Angeles and began making comedy movies. Theater director Tony Taccone brought home the film Cat on a Hot Tin Roof, a choice the other men teased as being "too theatrical". The film, however, inspired Schaffer to write an overwrought play, in the style of Tennessee Williams, called The Lonely Island, in reference to their apartment. The name eventually extended to the comedy group itself. On the Internet, Schaffer got his start directing The Lonely Island's The 'Bu, the group's record-breaking contribution to Channel 101, which was a parody of The OC and starred Sarah Chalke as Melissa, as well as Samberg and Taccone. Schaffer has contributed to several other Channel 101 productions as part of the Lonely Island.

In the fall of 2005, Schaffer was hired for Saturday Night Live where he directed, co-wrote, and edited the majority of the SNL Digital Shorts. Some notable shorts/songs include "Lazy Sunday", "I Just Had Sex", "Natalie's Rap", "Dick in a Box", "Peyton Manning for the United Way", "Iran So Far", "Jizz in My Pants", "Boombox", "I'm on a Boat", "Great Day", "Threw It on the Ground", "Jack Sparrow", "Like A Boss", "YOLO", "Semicolon", "Dear Sister", "Spring Break Anthem", "Shy Ronnie", "Ras Trent" and "Motherlover", the sequel to "Dick in a Box".

In 2007, Schaffer directed and acted in the film Hot Rod, which starred Samberg, Taccone, Bill Hader, Danny McBride, Isla Fisher, Ian McShane, and Sissy Spacek, which was produced by SNLs Lorne Michaels.

Schaffer directed the film The Watch starring Ben Stiller, Vince Vaughn, Jonah Hill and Richard Ayoade, and written by Seth Rogen and Evan Goldberg.

The Lonely Island has released three albums (Incredibad, Turtleneck & Chain, The Wack Album) along with two full soundtracks (Popstar: Never Stop Never Stopping and The Unauthorized Bash Brothers Experience). In 2014, the group co-wrote "Everything is Awesome", the theme song to the film, The Lego Movie. It was nominated for Best Original Song which they performed at the 2015 Oscars. That same year, Everything Is Awesome was certified platinum by the RIAA, joining their previous platinum singles, "I'm on a Boat" (2×), "I Just Had Sex", "Jizz in My Pants", and the gold-certified single "Like a Boss".

Schaffer was credited as an executive producer on the film MacGruber. The film was co-written and directed by Jorma Taccone.

In 2016 Schaffer co-wrote, co-directed, and co-starred in the Judd Apatow produced feature film, Popstar: Never Stop Never Stopping. The film focuses on pop/rap superstar Conner4Real (Samberg), who goes into a major tailspin and watches his celebrity high life collapse after his new album fails to sell records.

He also co-directed/created Michael Bolton's Big, Sexy Valentine's Day Special for Netflix with Scott Aukerman.

Schaffer directed four music videos for the band We Are Scientists and one for the Eagles of Death Metal.

In 2018, Schaffer guest-starred on NBC sitcom Brooklyn Nine-Nine, portraying Brett Booth in the episode Show me Going.

The Lonely Island co-produced both seasons of I Think You Should Leave with Tim Robinson, most episodes of which Schaffer has co-directed with Alice Mathias. Also in 2019, they released Netflix's The Unauthorized Bash Brothers Experience, a visual poem about former Oakland A's legends Jose Canseco and Mark McGwire. That summer, The Lonely Island embarked on their first ever live tour, instantly selling out venues across the United States and drawing some of the biggest crowds of the weekend at the Bonnaroo Festival and Milwaukee’s Summerfest.

Schaffer produced the film Palm Springs, which debuted on Hulu in July 2020 and delivered the largest opening weekend viewership ever for a film on the platform. Prior to launching on Hulu, NEON/Hulu acquired the film for a record-setting $17,500,000.69 at the 2020 Sundance Film Festival, making it the biggest deal in the festival's history. Most recently, the film and cast were nominated for five Super Critics Choice Awards, a Golden Globe Award nomination for Best Picture, Musical or Comedy, as well as a Best Performance by an Actor in a Motion Picture, Musical or Comedy nomination for Samberg. The film also won a Critics' Choice Movie Awards in the category of Best Comedy and garnered a Writers Guild of America Award nomination for Best Original Screenplay.

Schaffer also executive produces Hulu's Emmy nominated show, PEN15, starring Maya Erskine and Anna Konkle.

Schaffer directed the Disney film Chip 'n Dale: Rescue Rangers. The film stars Andy Samberg and John Mulaney and is a combination of live action and computer animation. It was released in Spring 2022.

Personal life

Schaffer is married to comedy writer and actress Liz Cackowski; they have two children.

Filmography

Film

Executive producer
 MacGruber (2010)

Acting credits

Television

TV specials

TV movies

Acting credits

Awards
In 2007, Schaffer won an Emmy for his participation in the production of "Dick in a Box". He was nominated for an Emmy for the song "Motherlover." He was featured in People's Sexiest Bachelor with Andy Samberg, as Sexiest Best Friends. He has also won two Writers Guild of America Awards and a Peabody Award for his work on Saturday Night Live. The Lonely Island was nominated in 2009 for a People's Choice Award and a Grammy Award.

References

External links
 The Lonely Island
 

1977 births
21st-century American comedians
21st-century American male actors
American comedy musicians
American Internet celebrities
American male comedians
American male film actors
American male television actors
American male television writers
American television directors
American television writers
Berkeley High School (Berkeley, California) alumni
Comedians from California
Comedy film directors
Film directors from California
Jewish American comedians
Living people
Male actors from Berkeley, California
Screenwriters from California
The Lonely Island members
University of California, Santa Cruz alumni
Writers from Berkeley, California